Saint-Michel–Notre-Dame is a station on RER B and RER C in Paris. Located in the 5th arrondissement, the station is named after the nearby Saint-Michel area and Notre-Dame Cathedral.

Situation

The main entrance to the station is in Place Saint-Michel on the Rive Gauche of the Seine. There is also a satellite entrance to the platforms of Line B on Place Notre-Dame, which is on the Île de la Cité across the Seine from Place Saint-Michel. The platforms of RER B are underneath the Seine and pass at right-angles under the RER C platforms.

Adjacent stations
Saint-Michel is on Paris Métro Line 4 and Cluny–La Sorbonne is on Paris Métro Line 10. The latter station was closed between 1939 and 1988, when it reopened to connect with the new RER station and give access to Boulevard Saint-Germain.

Bombing
On 25 July 1995, the station was the target of a terrorist attack, with a gas bottle exploding near one of the platforms, killing eight and wounding 80 people.

See also
 List of stations of the Paris RER

External links

 

Réseau Express Régional stations
Railway stations in France opened in 1979
Buildings and structures in the 5th arrondissement of Paris
Buildings and structures in the 6th arrondissement of Paris